Kodasoo is a village in Kuusalu Parish, Harju County in northern Estonia.

References

Villages in Harju County
Kreis Harrien